Luis Enrique Flores Ocaranza (born 18 July 1961) is a Mexican former professional footballer who played as a striker for Mexico at the 1986 FIFA World Cup.

Playing career

Club
Flores debuted with Club Universidad Nacional in the 79/80 season. In 1980-81 he was part of the squad that won the league championship. In 1985, he joined Spanish team Sporting Gijón. He made a total of 32 appearances and 10 goals with the Spanish team. The following season, he came back to Mexico with UNAM Pumas, but later was signed again by a new Spanish team Valencia CF. He had a successful season with Valencia appearing 36 times and scoring six goals. He later came back to Mexico with the European experience to play with clubs such as Cruz Azul, Atlas, and Guadalajara.

He was at Sporting while Luis Enrique was in its youth categories, and his nickname Lucho was also given to the player.

Coaching career
Flores has been the manager of Pumas, C.D. Veracruz, Atlético Celaya and Necaxa.

Honours
UNAM
Mexican Primera División: 1980–81
CONCACAF Champions' Cup: 1980, 1982
Copa Interamericana: 1981

Individual
Mexican Primera División Top Scorer: 1987–88

Career statistics

International goals

Notes

References

External links

1961 births
Living people
Footballers from Mexico City
Association football forwards
Mexican footballers
Mexico international footballers
1986 FIFA World Cup players
Club Universidad Nacional footballers
Sporting de Gijón players
Valencia CF players
Cruz Azul footballers
Atlas F.C. footballers
C.D. Guadalajara footballers
Liga MX players
La Liga players
Mexican expatriate footballers
Expatriate footballers in Spain
Mexican expatriate sportspeople in Spain
Mexican football managers
Club Universidad Nacional managers
C.D. Veracruz managers
Club Necaxa managers